Timur Zulfiqorov (Russian/Tajik:Тимур Зульфикаров/Темур Зулфиқоров) (born 17 August 1936) is a Russian / Tajik poet, playwright, and novelist. He was born in Dushanbe, Tajikistan.

Writing and awards 
Winner of Ivan Bunin Award for his work Zolotye Pismena Lyubvi (The Golden Letters of Love). The Nika Prize in 2001 was awarded to a romance to Zulfikarov's lyrics for the art-house melodrama Listen, Is It Raining? performed by singer Lina Mkrtchyan, written by composer Isaac Schwartz.

Works 
Gyron and Nolon on the Shipyard of Water.

References

External links
 

Zulfikarov, Timur
Zulfikarov, Timur
People from Dushanbe
Zulfikarov
Zulfikarov
Zulfikarov
Tajik poets
20th-century Tajikistani writers
21st-century Tajikistani writers
Maxim Gorky Literature Institute alumni
21st-century Tajikistani poets